Mac & Devin Go to High School is the collaborative soundtrack to the film of the same name, by American rappers and film stars Snoop Dogg and Wiz Khalifa. It was released on December 13, 2011, by Atlantic Records. The album features guest appearances from Bruno Mars, Juicy J, Curren$y and Mike Posner. The album is supported by the lone hit single, "Young, Wild & Free" (featuring Mars). The album received positive reviews from music critics, who praised Snoop's and Khalifa's technical rapping abilities and production choices. The soundtrack debuted at number 29 on the US Billboard 200, and has been certified gold by the Recording Industry Association of America (RIAA).

Background
Snoop Dogg announced plans for the release of a film, and soundtrack alongside Wiz Khalifa back in January, with the release of the song "That Good", originally intended to be the soundtrack's lead single. Wiz Khalifa spoke on the soundtrack saying "It's a real big deal because nobody's done it like that as far as a veteran in the game, an OG, a pioneer and then the newest, youngest, most exciting dude in rap coming through, and really just giving people a complete project," Wiz said. "I'm a fan of it, separate myself from making it, [I'm] a huge fan of it. Can't wait." As far as the musical vibe of the soundtrack, Snoop described it, "It's something to relax you and get you through the day; it's some real good music. The music is quality, I don't even have no title for it, as far as what kinda music is it, it's centric, it's ...," Dogg said searching for the right words before his partner-in-rhyme lent a hand. "Eclectic," Wiz chimed in.

Singles
"Young, Wild & Free", the soundtrack's lead single which features Bruno Mars, and produced by The Smeezingtons, was released on October 11, 2011. In its first week it sold 159,000 digital copies, debuting at number 10 on the US Billboard Hot 100, and number 44 on the Canadian Hot 100. The music video was filmed on October 19, 2011.

Commercial performance
In his home country of United States, Mac & Devin Go to High School debuted at number 29 on the Billboard 200, selling 38,000 copies in its first week. In Canada, the album debuted at number 96. As of February 2012 the album has sold 107,000 copies in the United States. In 2016 Mac & Devin Go to High School was certified gold by the Recording Industry Association of America (RIAA), for combined album sales, on-demand audio, video streams, track sales equivalent of 500,000.

Track listing

Charts

Weekly charts

Year-end charts

Certifications

References

2011 soundtrack albums
Albums produced by Cardo
Albums produced by Drumma Boy
Albums produced by Exile (producer)
Albums produced by Jake One
Albums produced by Nottz
Albums produced by the Smeezingtons
Albums produced by Soopafly
Albums produced by Warren G
Atlantic Records soundtracks
Doggystyle Records albums
Wiz Khalifa albums
Snoop Dogg albums
Collaborative albums
Cannabis music
Albums produced by 1500 or Nothin'
Hip hop soundtracks